Richard Kramer (born April 21, 1952) is an American film and television writer and producer, playwright and novelist. His film and television credits include thirtysomething, Family, My So-Called Life, Nothing Sacred, Once and Again, Queer as Folk and Tales of the City.

Kramer's first stage play, Theater District, was staged in 2002 in Chicago, and won a Joseph Jefferson Award. Kramer published his debut novel, These Things Happen, in 2012. The novel was nominated for a Lambda Literary Award in the Gay Fiction category at the 2013 Lambda Literary Awards.

References

External links
Richard Kramer

1952 births
Living people
American television writers
20th-century American dramatists and playwrights
American male screenwriters
American television producers
American gay writers
American LGBT screenwriters
21st-century American novelists
American LGBT dramatists and playwrights
American LGBT novelists
American male novelists
American male television writers
American male dramatists and playwrights
20th-century American novelists
20th-century American male writers
21st-century American male writers